Edward José (5 July 1865 – 18 December 1930) was a Belgian film director and actor of the silent era. He directed 42 films between 1915 and 1925. He also performed in 12 films between 1910 and 1916.

Selected filmography

 The Stain (1914)
 The Perils of Pauline (1914)
 A Fool There Was (1915)
 The Celebrated Scandal (1915)
 Anna Karenina (1915)
 A Woman's Resurrection (1915)
 The Beloved Vagabond (1915)
 The Iron Claw (1916)
 Ashes of Embers (1916)
 Pearl of the Army (1916)
 Mayblossom (1917)
 Her Silent Sacrifice (1917)
 Poppy (1917)
 Resurrection (1918)
 Woman and Wife (1918)
 The Isle of Conquest (1919)
 The Riddle: Woman (1920)
 The Yellow Typhoon (1920)
 The Inner Chamber (1921)
 Her Lord and Master (1921)
 The Matrimonial Web (1921)
 Rainbow (1921)
 The Scarab Ring (1921)
 What Women Will Do (1921)
 The Prodigal Judge (1922)
 The Man from Downing Street (1922)
 The Girl in His Room (1922)
 Terror (1924)

References

External links

1865 births
1930 deaths
Belgian film directors
Belgian male silent film actors
Actors from Rotterdam
20th-century Belgian male actors
Mass media people from Rotterdam